Lake Cholila (Lago Cholila) is a lake in Chubut Province, Argentina.  Lake Cholila is the uppermost of several large lakes in the Futaleufú River system of Argentina that via Yelcho Lake and the Yelcho River flows into the Pacific Ocean in Chile. The lake is of glacial origin and occupies a narrow east to west valley between glaciated peaks of the Andes.

Description
The Tigre River is born in glaciers at an altitude of about  along the border with Chile. The outlet at the lower end of the lake is the Carrileufú River (River of Green Waters in the Mapuche language). The Carrileufú River should not be confused with the Carrenleufú or Palena River. Both names derive from the same Mapuche word. Although the lake is not located in a national park, the lake shore is mostly in a natural state. Cattle raising, tourism, and sport fishing are the principal occupations of the sparsely populated region.

Recreation
Sport fishing is popular in the lake and in the rivers.  Trout, not native to South America, are the chief attraction, including brook trout, brown trout, rainbow trout, and landlocked Atlantic salmon. Native species of fish include "trucha criolla" (Percichthys trucha) and "puyen" (Galaxias). Boating is popular on the lake and rafting, kayaking, and canoeing are popular on the Carrileufú River below the lake.

Butch Cassidy
For several months in 1905, the outlaws Butch Cassidy and the Sundance Kid may have hidden from Pinkerton detectives in a cabin where the Tigre River joins Lake Cholila. The two outlaws owned a ranch near the town of Cholila.

Footnotes

Cholila
Cholila
Cholila
Cholila